"Rock This Boat" is a song written by Greg Arnold and recorded by Australian folk-rock band Things of Stone and Wood. The song was released in March 1993 as the third single from the band's debut studio album The Yearning. "Rock This Boat" peaked at number 51 on the ARIA Charts.

Track listing

Charts

References

1992 songs
1993 singles
Things of Stone and Wood songs
Songs written by Greg Arnold